The 1924 Chicago Maroons football team was an American football team that represented the University of Chicago during the 1924 Big Ten Conference football season. In their 33rd season under head coach Amos Alonzo Stagg, the Maroons compiled a 4–1–3 record, won the Big Ten Conference championship, and outscored their opponents by a combined total of 88 to 40.

Notable players on the 1924 Chicago team included guard Joe Pondelik and tackle Frank Gowdy. Pondelik was a consensus first-team All-American in 1924. Gowdy was selected as a first-team All-American by several selectors, including Football World, Liberty magazine, and All-Sports Magazine.

Fritz Crisler was an assistant coach on the team.

Schedule

References

Chicago
Chicago Maroons football seasons
Big Ten Conference football champion seasons
Chicago Football